SBB Cargo International is a rail transport business founded as a joint venture between SBB Cargo and Hupac The headquarters will be at Olten. handling international rail freight in Europe. SBB Cargo International is due to commence operations at the start of 2011.

History
Following the failure of SBB's plans to strengthen the profitability and financial independence of its Cargo division by selling stakes to other international railway operators, SBB Cargo changed to an alternative solution. A new railway undertaking called SBB Cargo International was founded in partnership with intermodal transport operator Hupac. The new company focuses on block and intermodal trains on the European North-South corridor between Germany and Italy. The shareholders in the new company are SBB Cargo (75%) and Hupac (25%), with further partners possible in the future. The aim is to achieve cost leadership in the intermodal segment by optimising resources on selected routes and halving structural costs. The new company’s customers will primarily comprise intermodal operators, who will account for about 80% of the planned total sales of CHF 300 million.

Fleet
SBB Cargo International will, initially, lease 109 locomotives from SBB Cargo; 59 will be multi-system locomotives for cross-border use.

External links
Hupac
SBB Cargo
SBB Cargo International

References

Railway companies of Switzerland
Rail freight transport in Switzerland
Joint ventures
Companies based in Olten
Swiss companies established in 2011
Transport companies established in 2011